Maksim Nehoda (born 7 July 1998) is a Belarusian Greco-Roman wrestler. He won the gold medal in the 63 kg event at the 2020 European Wrestling Championships held in Rome, Italy.

Career 

In 2019, he won one of the bronze medals in the 63 kg event at the World U23 Wrestling Championship in Budapest, Hungary. Earlier that year, he also competed in the 63 kg event at the 2019 European Wrestling Championships held in Bucharest, Romania and in the 63 kg event at the 2019 World Wrestling Championships held in Nur-Sultan, Kazakhstan.

In April 2021, he competed in the 67 kg event at the European Wrestling Championships held in Warsaw, Poland. In October 2021, he competed in the 67 kg event at the World Wrestling Championships held in Oslo, Norway.

Major results

References

External links 

 

Living people
1998 births
Place of birth missing (living people)
Belarusian male sport wrestlers
European Wrestling Championships medalists
European Wrestling Champions
21st-century Belarusian people